9 Hydrae is a single star in the equatorial constellation of Hydra, located 205 light years away from the Sun. It is visible to the naked eye as a faint, yellow-orange hued star with an apparent visual magnitude of 4.87. This body is moving closer to the Sun with a heliocentric radial velocity of −2 km/s.

It is a red clump giant, which indicates it is on the horizontal branch and is generating energy through helium fusion at its core. The star has 1.7 times the mass of the Sun but, as a consequence of evolving away from the main sequence, its envelope has swollen to 11 times the Sun's radius. It is radiating 54 times the luminosity of the Sun from its enlarged photosphere at an effective temperature of 4,688 K.

References

K-type giants
Horizontal-branch stars
Hydra (constellation)
Durchmusterung objects
Hydrae, 09
074137
042662
3441